The Westfort Hurricanes were a Canadian Junior ice hockey club from Fort William, Ontario.  The Herks were members of the Thunder Bay Junior A Hockey League and were Abbott Cup finalists once.

History
In 1972, the Hurricanes broke away from the Thunder Bay Junior A Hockey League to join the St. Paul, Minnesota-based Can-Am Junior Hockey League.  A year later, that league became the Midwest Junior Hockey League.  The Herks stayed on board for one Midwest Junior season before returning to the TBJHL.

Dave Siciliano coached the Hurricanes during the 1973–74 season. His team completed the regular season in first place with 45 wins in 60 games. In the 1974 Centennial Cup playoffs, the Hurricanes defeated the Wexford Raiders four games to three in the first round, then were defeated four games to three by the Smiths Falls Bears in the second round.

The MWJHL later merged and solidified the United States Hockey League. The Buccaneers folded on July 6, 1980 when the TBAHA left them with no league to play in.

Season-by-season standings

Playoffs
1971 Lost Final
Westfort Hurricanes defeated Fort William Canadians 3-games-to-2
Thunder Bay Marrs defeated Westfort Hurricanes 4-games-to-1
1972 Lost Semi-final
Minnesota Jr. Stars defeated Westfort Hurricanes 2-games-to-none
1973 Lost Quarter-final/Canadian TBAHA Semi-final
Thunder Bay Centennials defeated Westfort Hurricanes 4-games-to-2
1974 Won TBAHA Jack Adams Trophy final, Lost Hewitt-Dudley Memorial Trophy final
Thunder Bay Hurricanes defeated Thunder Bay Eagles (TBJHL) 3-games-to-none
Thunder Bay Hurricanes defeated Fort William Canadians (TBJHL) 4-games-to-none JACK ADAMS TROPHY CHAMPIONS
Thunder Bay Hurricanes defeated Wexford Raiders (OPJHL) 4-games-to-3
Smiths Falls Bears (CJHL) defeated Thunder Bay Hurricanes 4-games-to-3
1975 Lost Final
Thunder Bay Hurricanes defeated Thunder Bay Beavers 4-games-to-2
Thunder Bay Eagles defeated Thunder Bay Hurricanes 4-games-to-1
1976 Lost Semi-final
Thunder Bay Beavers defeated Thunder Bay Hurricanes 4-games-to-2
1977 Lost Final
Degagne Hurricanes defeated Thunder Bay Beavers 3-games-to-none and 1 tie
Thunder Bay Eagles defeated Degagne Hurricanes 4-games-to-1
1978 Won League, Lost Hewitt-Dudley Memorial Trophy Quarter-final
Degagne Hurricanes defeated Thunder Bay Beavers 3-games-to-none
Degagne Hurricanes defeated Atikokan Voyageurs 4-games-to-none TBJHL CHAMPIONS
Guelph Platers (OPJHL) defeated Degagne Hurricanes 4-games-to-none
1979 Lost Final
Thunder Bay North Stars defeated Degagne Buccaneers 4-games-to-1
1980 Lost Final
Thunder Bay North Stars defeated Degagne Buccaneers 4-games-to-none with 1 tie

Championships
TBJHL Champions:
1942, 1943, 1952, 1960, 1968, 1969, 1970, 1974*, 1978
Abbott Cup Finalists:
1970
Dudley Hewitt Cup/Eastern Centennial Cup Semi Final Champion
1974

(*) denotes: Herks played in MWJHL, rejoined TBJHL for playoffs.

Notable alumni
Fort William Hurricane-Rangers 
Gus Bodnar
Alex Delvecchio
Bill Johansen
Bud Poile
Fort William Hurricanes 
Mike Busniuk
Larry Cahan
Dave Gatherum
Ed Kachur
Dennis Owchar
Don Poile
Vic Venasky
Tommy Williams
Gord Wilson
Westfort Hurricanes 
Lou Nistico
Murray Wing
Benny Woit
Thunder Bay Westfort Hurricanes 
Mike Hordy
Trevor Johansen

References

Defunct junior ice hockey teams in Canada
Hockey Northwestern Ontario